Jose Gómez may refer to:

Arts and entertainment
 José Luis Gómez (actor) (born 1940), Spanish film actor and director

Sports

Association football
 José Gregorio Gómez (born 1963), Venezuelan footballer
 Jose Gomez (American soccer) (born 1979), American soccer player
 Joselu (footballer, born 1990) (José Luis Gómez Hurtado), Spanish footballer
 José Luis Gómez (footballer) (born 1993), Argentine footballer

Combat sports
 Pepper Gomez, (José Serapio Palimino Gomez, 1927–2004), American professional wrestler
 José Gómez Mustelier (born 1959), Cuban boxer

Cycling
 José Gómez del Moral (1931–2021), Spanish cyclist
 José Gómez (cyclist) (1944–2014), Spanish Olympic cyclist
 José Ángel Gómez Marchante (born 1980), Spanish road bicycle racer

Other sports
 José Gómez Ortega (1895–1920), Spanish bullfighter
 José Gómez (sport shooter) (born 1919), Guatemalan Olympic shooter
 José Gómez (runner) (born 1956), Mexican distance runner

Others
 José Miguel Gómez (1858–1921), Cuban general and President
 José Gómez-Sicre (1916–1991), Cuban author and lawyer
 José Gómez (activist) (1943–2014), American labor and civil rights activist
 José Luis Gómez Martínez (born 1943), Spanish university professor of Spanish language
 José Horacio Gómez (born 1951), American Roman Catholic Archbishop

See also
 José Gomes (disambiguation)